The  Tampa Bay Storm season was the sixth season for the Arena Football League franchise. They finished 9–1 in the Southern Division, tied with the Orlando Predators, but Orlando won the division due to having scored more points than the Storm. The Storm lost in the AFL's Semi-finals to Orlando

Regular season

Schedule

Standings

z – clinched homefield advantage

y – clinched division title

x – clinched playoff spot

Playoffs

Roster

Awards

References

External links
1992 Tampa Bay Storm season at arenafan.com

Tampa Bay Storm
Tampa Bay Storm seasons
Tampa Bay Storm